Leonhard Münst (born 22 January 2002) is a German professional footballer who plays as a midfielder for St. Gallen on loan from VfB Stuttgart.

References

External links

2002 births
Living people
German footballers
Association football midfielders
VfB Stuttgart players
FC St. Gallen players
Swiss Super League players